Dryocampa is a genus of moths in the family Saturniidae.

Systematics
Dryocampa alba
Dryocampa bicolor
Dryocampa pallida
Dryocampa rubicunda (Fabricius, 1793) — U.S.
Dryocampa semialba
Dryocampa sperryae

References

Ceratocampinae

de:Dryocampa rubicunda